Myles P. Shevlin (died 1990) was an Irish republican Dublin-based solicitor known as 'the Provisionals' "legal adviser"' Shevlin represented several individuals accused of IRA membership and/or activity.
During the IRA border campaign ("Operation Harvest") of the late 1950s, Shevlin was for a time the IRA Adjutant-General and a member of its Army Council.

On 20 June 1972, he attended and took notes at a meeting of IRA representatives with William Whitelaw, the British Secretary of State for Northern Ireland, in London. The representatives included Gerry Adams, Martin McGuinness and Dáithí Ó Conaill.

Death
He died at his home in Dublin in 1990.

References

External links
 Irish Emigrant newspaper

Year of birth unknown
1990 deaths
20th-century Irish lawyers
Irish republicans
Lawyers from Dublin (city)
People from County Carlow